MIDAC is an acronym created in 1981 by a Sydney-based business, Combined Resources Computing (CRC). It stands for Microprocessor Intelligent Data Acquisition and Control. CRC was established in order to complete several building automation projects commenced by R-Tec.

R-Tec was an Australian development company based in Sydney that focussed on designing innovative computerised building automation products. The proprietors formed R-Tec in the late 1970s after leaving Johnson Controls. The early R-Tec automation systems used TTL logic with control parameters stored in dynamic memory. 
The early computerised building automation systems or BAS monitored alarms and conditions relating to building services including air conditioning, water and power, etc. They also controlled plant by starting and stopping pumps and fans according to time and other interlock conditions.

The systems of the 1970s and early 1980s used parallel or multiple conductor communications data busses to communication with Data Gathering Panels (DGPs) located throughout the building. The DGPs would communicate monitored conditions using multiplex techniques back to a central location and "front end" system through the parallel data trunk.  In the same way commands to start and stop plant would be sent from the front end to the DGP and then to the machine. All decisions or "intelligence" was centrally located, and the DGPs simply relayed information.

Combined Resources Computing was established by Kevin Johnson-Bade, an ex R-Tec software engineer, with the prime goal of completing the building automation system contracted to R-Tec by the University of Melbourne. This occurred when R-Tec closed down, being unable to complete its contractual commitments.

The University of Melbourne building automation system was ambitious. In 1982 it was possibly the first successful implementation of a distributed intelligence building automation or Direct Digital Control or DDC system using Z80 microprocessors. Remote units called Satellite Intelligence Units (SIUs) were located in buildings around the campus and were connected to the front end using a serial communications. See: Distributed control system

CRC developed a unique object-oriented control algorithm building approach. Even though the Z80 microprocessor of the time ran at only 1 MHz, and had a memory addressing range of 64 Kbytes, the University of Melbourne system out-performed other automations systems of the time significantly. CRC created a front-end computer that used ten processors to share the task, having access to up to 256 pages of shared memory. Each SIU used two Z80 processors. This allowed the intelligence to be shared, and many decisions to be made locally thus further reducing the load on the front end and reducing communications.
The University of Melbourne system was a leader in the development of distributed intelligence DDC system. 
Out of CRC Midac System Pty Limited was formed in 1982, and went on to develop and implement more leading DDC technology included systems where the front-end computer was a CPM operating system MZ3500 Sharp personal computer. The Sharp was chosen because of its much superior graphics compared with the early IBM PC of the early 1980s.

Over the following years the major players like Johnson and Honeywell would follow, replacing their mini-computer front-end terminals with PCs as they implemented microprocessor-based distributed intelligence systems using serial communications networks. Toward the end of the 1980s and early 1990s most DDC systems included an object-oriented control algorithm building tool. They compiled the object-oriented instructions into the system's native proprietary linear language, whereas in the Midac approach the control system's native language or operating environment was itself object-oriented.

Midac went on to develop three new generations of  microprocessor-based DDC systems, the last version being Nexus, developed for DKS that was taken over by James Hardie's Building Automation division. That business and its assets including Nexus were purchased by Chubb International in the late 1990s.

History

1981-1983 Developed Concurrent Processing Multi-user DDC "Super Computer"

1982 Developed innovative Object Oriented Control Algorithm Building Language

1982 Implemented one of the world's first Distributed DDC Systems

1983 Pioneered Full DDC (Direct Digital Control) Energy Management Systems

1985 Provided First Full DDC Teaching System for TAFE

1988 - 1989 Designed and released Australia's first Home Automation technology

1990 - 1992 Developed Nexus - AI DDC system modeled on the human body

1995 Early WWW Political "Vote". First use of CyberVote term see Electronic voting examples

1995 Pioneered early Online Business Gateway/Portal sites in Australia

1998 eCommerce Gateway using Application Service Provider approach

2002 Released GatewayEngine, ReceptionCounter and RingForHelp products

2003 YesBookit - the first online booking management system for real estate agents

Building automation
Building engineering
Heating, ventilation, and air conditioning